UrQMD (Ultra relativistic Quantum Molecular Dynamics) is a fully integrated Monte Carlo simulation package for Proton+Proton, Proton+nucleus and nucleus+nucleus interactions. UrQMD has many applications in particle physics, high energy experimental physics and engineering, shielding, detector design, cosmic ray studies, and medical physics.

Since version 3.3, an option has been incorporated to substitute part of the collision with a hydrodynamic model.

UrQMD is available in as open-source Fortran code.

UrQMD is developed using the FORTRAN language. Under Linux the  gfortran compiler is necessary to build and run the program.

The UrQMD  model is part of the GEANT4 simulation package and can be used as a low-energy hadronic interaction model within the air shower simulation code CORSIKA.

External links 
 Official site of UrQMD collaboration

Fortran software
Physics software
Monte Carlo particle physics software
Science software for Linux